The LSU Tigers women's soccer team represents Louisiana State University in the sport of soccer. The Tigers compete in Division I of the National Collegiate Athletics Association (NCAA) and the Southeastern Conference (SEC). The Tigers play their home games at the LSU Soccer Stadium on the university's Baton Rouge, Louisiana campus.

History 

The LSU Tigers soccer team's first season was in 1995. The Tigers' first coach was Miriam Hickey who compiled a record of 22–17–1 at LSU from 1995 to 1996. The second coach in LSU soccer history was Gregg Boggs who coached the Tigers from 1997 to 1999. He had a record of 12–44–3. In 2000, George Fotopoulos was hired as head coach of the LSU soccer team and amassed a record of 52–39–8 during his 5 years at LSU. During George Fotopoulos' final season in 2004, his wife Danielle Fotopoulos was hired as co-head coach of the LSU soccer team. During her only season at LSU, she along with her husband compiled a record of 8–11–1 in 2004.

In 2005, Brian Lee was named head soccer coach at LSU. He coached LSU for fourteen seasons until he left following the 2018 season. During his tenure the Tigers compiled a record of 143–100–45 and won 4 SEC West Division titles in 2007, 2008, 2009 and 2011. The Tigers won their first SEC Tournament in program history in 2018.

Year-by-year results 
East and West Divisions were removed in 2013.

*Incomplete season due to COVID-19.

Prominent players

All-Americans
National Soccer Coaches Association of America

Stadium

LSU Soccer Stadium

The LSU Soccer Stadium is a soccer facility located on the campus of Louisiana State University in Baton Rouge.  The facility, built in 1996, serves as the home of the LSU Tigers soccer team. The two-level stadium has a seating capacity of 2,197.

Practice and Training facilities

LSU Indoor Practice facility
The LSU Indoor Practice Facility, built in 1991, is a climate-controlled 8,250 square feet facility. It is used when inclement weather prevents the soccer team from practicing at the LSU Soccer Stadium. It holds the 100-yd Anderson-Feazel LSU Indoor field. The playing surface is Momentum Field Turf by SportExe.

Strength and Conditioning facility
The LSU Tigers soccer team weight room is over 10,000 square feet and includes multi-purpose flat surface platform, bench, incline, squat and Olympic lifting stations along with dumbbell bench stations. It is also equipped with medicine balls, hurdles, plyometric boxes, assorted speed and agility equipment, treadmills, stationary bikes and elliptical cross trainers. The weight room features multiple high-definition TV's for multimedia presentations. It is located in the LSU Football Operations Center.

Training room
The training room located in the LSU Football Operations Center features hydrotherapy which includes hot/cold Jacuzzis and an underwater treadmill and multiple stations to treat the players.

Current roster
as of 2022

Head coaches

See also 
 LSU Tigers and Lady Tigers

Footnotes

References

External links 
 Official website

 
Association football clubs established in 1995
1995 establishments in Louisiana
NCAA Division I women's soccer teams